was a Japanese football player. He played for Japan national team.

Club career
Honda played for Waseda WMW was consisted of his alma mater Waseda University players and graduates. At the club, he played with many Japan national team players Shigeyoshi Suzuki, Haruo Arima, Misao Tamai, Tamotsu Asakura, Shigeru Takahashi, Shojiro Sugimura, Ko Takamoro, Michiyo Taki and Tameo Ide. He won 1928 Emperor's Cup at the club.

National team career
In August 1927, when Honda was a Waseda University Senior High School student, he was selected Japan national team for 1927 Far Eastern Championship Games in Shanghai. At this competition, on August 27, he debuted against Republic of China. On August 29, he also played against Philippines, and Japan won this match. This is Japan national team first victory in International A Match. He also played at 1930 Far Eastern Championship Games in Tokyo and Japan won the championship. He played 4 games for Japan until 1930.

National team statistics

References

External links
 
 Japan National Football Team Database

Year of birth missing
Year of death missing
Waseda University alumni
Japanese footballers
Japan international footballers
Association football midfielders